Levetzow is a surname of:

 Albert von Levetzow (1827–1903), German politician
 Amalie von Levetzow (1788–1868), German noblewoman
 Cornelia von Levetzow (1836–1921), Danish author 
 Karl Michael von Levetzow (1871–1945), German poet and librettist
 Ulrike von Levetzow (1804–1899), German baroness, friend and the last love of Johann Wolfgang von Goethe

German-language surnames